Estadio Municipal Amatitlán is a soccer stadium in Amatitlán, Guatemala. Home to Deportivo Amatitlán of the third division, it has a capacity of 12,000 people.

Municipal Amatitlan